Bashir Abdi (born 10 February 1989) is a Somali-born Belgian athlete who specializes in long-distance running. He won bronze medals in the marathon at the 2020 Tokyo Olympics and 2022 World Championships. In doing so, Abdi became both the first ever Belgian world championship medal winner at the marathon and the first Belgian male athlete to win an individual medal at both the Olympic Games and World Athletics Championships. He was also the silver medalist in the 10,000 metres at the 2018 European Championships. He is the European record holder for the marathon.

Abdi also holds the Belgian records in the half marathon and one hour run, and the world best in the rarely contested 20,000 metres on track.

Personal life 
Abdi was born in El Afweyn, Somaliland, a town mainly inhabited by the Habr Je'lo clan of the Isaaq clan-family. When he was eight, his family moved to Djibouti. He then spent a year and a half in Ethiopia, before settling in Belgium. There, aged 16, he started training at the Racing Club Gent Athletics, following his brother Ibrahim.

Abdi is married and has a daughter, Kadra, born 2018, and a son Ibrahim; born 2020. He is a co-founder and vice-chairman of the non-profit organization Sportaround, which organizes after-school sports activities for children in Ghent.

Running career

2014–2017
Abdi entered the 10,000 m 2014 European athletics championships with the European leading time set on 4 May.

In May 2015, he qualified for the 2016 Rio Olympics.

At the Games, Abdi competed in both the men's 5000m and 10,000m. He finished 20th in the 10,000m final, a race won by Great Britain's Mo Farah.  

In 2017, he competed in the London 2017 World Championships in athletics in the men's 5000m, placing 6th in his heat.

2018–2019: Beginning of marathon career
In 2018, Abdi made his marathon debut at the Rotterdam Marathon, placing 7th in 2:10:46. The race was won by Kenya's Kenneth Kipkemoi in 2:05:44. In August 2018, he won silver in the 10,000 metres at the 2018 European Athletics Championships. In the autumn Abdi raced several road races placing 3rd at the Great North Run half marathon in 1:00:42, 4th at the Dam tot Damloop 10 miler in 46:08, 5th in the Nijmegen Zevenheuvelenloop 15km in 43:40 and 3rd at the Heerenberg Montferland Run 15km in 43:40.

In 2019, he was second at the Vitality Big Half Marathon in 1:01:16 in a close finish with race winner Mo Farah and 3rd placer Daniel Wanjiru. Abdi then competed in the 2019 London Marathon, placing 7th in 2:07:03 in a race won by Kenya's Eliud Kipchoge in 2:02:37. In August, he was second in the Beach to Beacon 10km in the United States, finishing in 28:35. The race was initially won by Kenya's Alex Korio, however he was disqualified. Jairus Birech came in second. Abdi headed back to Newcastle upon Tyne where he raced the Great North Run half marathon finishing 5th in 1:01:11, the race was won by Mo Farah. In October, Abdi ran in the 2019 Chicago Marathon, finishing 5th in 2:06:14, the race was won by Kenya's Lawrence Cherono in 2:05:45 in a sprint finish. Abdi next raced at the Montferland Run 15km placing 5th in 42:29. On New Year's Eve in Spain he won the San Silvestre Vallecana 10km in Madrid in 27:47.

2020–present: Marathon breakthrough
Abdi opened his 2020 racing campaign by winning the Egmond Half Marathon. He then achieved his first marathon podium position by placing 2nd in the 2020 Tokyo Marathon in a new personal best time of 2:04:49. He passed Ethiopia's Sisay Lemma in the closing stages to finish behind the race winner Ethiopia's Birhanu Legese who ran a time of 2:04:15. Abdi returned to the track in September competing at the Memorial Van Damme in the one hour race. He ran the majority of the race with Mo Farah, taking the lead and setting a European record at 20,000m of 56:20.02. He finished second behind Farah setting a mark of 21322 metres.

In 2021, Abdi was second behind Farah at the Djibouti International Half Marathon in 1:03:11. He then placed second at the European 10,000 m Cup in Birmingham in a new personal best of 27:24.41. This performance qualified him for the 10,000 m event at the delayed 2020 Tokyo Olympic Games; however, at the Olympics he focused on the marathon, winning a bronze medal.

In October 2021, Abdi won the rescheduled Rotterdam Marathon, setting a European record in the marathon of 2:03:36.

In April 2022, he placed fourth at the Rotterdam Marathon. Abdi earned his first medal at a World Marathon Major by placing third at the 2022 London Marathon in October with a time of 2:05:19.

Statistics

Competition record

Personal bests

References

External links

 

1989 births
Living people
Sportspeople from Mogadishu
Belgian male long-distance runners
Somalian male long-distance runners
Belgian male cross country runners
Somalian male cross country runners
Belgian male marathon runners
Somalian male marathon runners
Somalian emigrants to Belgium
Olympic athletes of Belgium
Olympic bronze medalists for Belgium
Olympic bronze medalists in athletics (track and field)
Athletes (track and field) at the 2016 Summer Olympics
Athletes (track and field) at the 2020 Summer Olympics
Medalists at the 2020 Summer Olympics
World Athletics Championships athletes for Belgium
Black Belgian sportspeople
Naturalised citizens of Belgium